Chinese Australians are Australians of Chinese ancestry. Chinese Australians are one of the largest groups within the global Chinese diaspora, and are the largest Asian Australian community. Per capita, Australia has more people of Chinese ancestry than any country outside Asia. As a whole, Australian residents identifying themselves as having Chinese ancestry made up 5.5% of Australia's population at the 2021 census.

The very early history of Chinese Australians involved significant immigration from villages of the Pearl River Delta in South China, with most such immigrants speaking dialects within the Yue dialect group. The Gold rushes lured many Chinese to the Australian colonies in the 19th century. As with many overseas Chinese groups the world over, early Chinese immigrants to Australia established several Chinatowns in major cities, such as Sydney (Chinatown, Sydney), Melbourne (Chinatown, Melbourne), Brisbane (Chinatown, Brisbane) and Perth (Chinatown, Perth). Australians of full or partial Chinese origin form the majority of the population of the Australian external territory of Christmas Island.

History 

Chinese peoples have a long and continuing role in Australian history. There were early links between China and Australia when Macau and Canton were used as an important trading ports with the fledgling colony. Mak Sai Ying (also known as John Shying) was the first officially recorded Chinese migrant in 1818. After his arrival he spent some time farming before, in 1829, he became prominent as the publican of The Lion in Parramatta. Early 19th Century migration was in limited numbers and sporadic, primarily those who came in this period were free merchants or adventurers and, the more common, indentured labourers.

The Australian Gold Rushes are what first lured thousands of Chinese to the country. In 1855 in Melbourne there were 11,493 Chinese arrivals. This was startling considering that barely five years previous, Melbourne's entire population had only been around 25,000 people. By 1858, 42,000 Chinese immigrants had arrived in Victoria, with many of them living in boarding houses in Little Bourke Street. Due to the widespread racist sentiments in parliament and on the goldfields, the first of many immigration restrictions and Chinese targeting laws was passed in late 1855. However, due to the long, poorly regulated borders between the colonies of Australia the numbers of Chinese on the goldfields continued to swell. Upon the goldfields Chinese peoples faced many hardships. There were violent anti-Chinese riots; the Buckland Riot, the Lambing Flats Riots, as well as general discrimination and prejudice. However, there were many establishments in this period that would have a lasting effect on the history of Australia and the history of Chinese in Australia. One of these establishments were the Chinese camps, which most often, later, became Chinatowns in Australia. There was also the establishment and the consolidation of power for Chinese societies, many of these are still active in Australia today. These societies provided support and community for the Chinese in the colonies.

After the gold rushes the numbers of Chinese living in the cities swelled and their businesses and industries contributed much to growth of Melbourne and Sydney in the late 19th century. Mei Quong Tart and Lowe Kong Meng were prominent business figures in Sydney and Melbourne respectively. However, there were very few Chinese women migrating to Australia. At one point in the 1860s the numbers of Chinese in Australia was around 40,000. Of these, it is believed only 12, were women. This gender imbalance meant that Chinese men married women of European descent but many had it in their hearts to return to China.

Anti-Chinese sentiment also strongly contributed to the establishment of the Federation of Australia. Some of the first Acts of the new federation would establish the White Australia Policy. This policy made it almost impossible for anyone new to migrate from China to Australia. After federation the population of Chinese in Australia steadily declined. Despite the declining numbers people with Chinese heritage still played their part in Australian history. There were over 200 people with Chinese heritage who fought for Australia in World War I, including the decorated sniper Billy Sing. A similar number fought for Australia in World War II.

The final end of the White Australia Policy from the 1960s saw new arrivals from the Chinese diaspora and for the first time significant numbers from non-Cantonese speaking parts of China. The first wave of arrivals were ethnic Chinese refugees from Vietnam and Cambodia during the 1970s. This was followed by economic immigrants from Hong Kong and Taiwan in the 1980s and 1990s, whose families often settled in the capital cities. New institutions were established for these arrivals and old ones such as the Chinese Chamber of Commerce revived, while numerous Chinese language newspapers were once again published in the capital cities. Ethnic Chinese settlers from Peru immigrated to Australia following the Peruvian dictatorship of Revolutionary Government of the Armed Forces of Peru in 1968.

After the 1989 Tiananmen Square protests, then-Australian Prime Minister, Bob Hawke, allowed students from China to settle in Australia permanently. Since the 2000s, with the rapid development of China's economy, there has been an explosion in the number of immigrants from China, which have frequently been Australia's largest source of new immigrants since 2000. In 2015-16, China (excluding Hong Kong and Macau) was the second largest source of immigrants to Australia behind India. China (excluding Hong Kong, Macau and Taiwan) is now the third largest foreign birthplace for Australian residents, after England and New Zealand.

Demographics

At the 2021 census, 1,390,637 Australian residents identified themselves as having Chinese ancestry, accounting for 5.5% of the total population.

In 2019, the Australian Bureau of Statistics estimated that there were 677,240 Australian residents born in Mainland China, 101,290 born in Hong Kong, 59,250 born in Taiwan and 3,130 born in Macau. There are also a large number of persons of Chinese ancestry among those born in Southeast Asian countries such as Malaysia, Indonesia, Singapore, the Philippines and Vietnam.

Before the end of the 20th century, Chinese Australians were predominately of Cantonese and Hakka descent from Mainland China, Hong Kong and Macau, and Cantonese was the dominant language. Due to more recent immigration from other regions of China, Mandarin has surpassed Cantonese by number of speakers.

In a 2004 study on the intermarriage pattern in Australia, the proportion of second-generation Chinese Australians with spouses of Anglo-Celtic ancestry was approximately 21% and for third generation it was 68%.

According to Australian Bureau of Statistics, in 2012 Chinese immigrant mothers had a total fertility of 1.59 children per woman, lower compared to the Australian average of 1.94. This declined to 1.19 and 1.73 respectively in 2019.

Language
At the 2021 census, 685,274 persons declared that they spoke Mandarin at home (the most common language spoken at home in Australia after English at 2.8%), followed by Cantonese at 295,281 (the fourth most common after English at 1.2%). Many Chinese Australians speak other Chinese dialects such as Shanghainese, Hokkien and Hakka at home. Many Chinese Australians from other areas speak Tagalog (Philippines), Malay (Malaysia, Singapore, and Brunei), Vietnamese, Thai and Portuguese (Macau) as additional languages. Second or higher generation Chinese Australians are often either monolingual in English or bilingual to varying degrees with Chinese.

Religion

According to the census data collected in the last twenty years, among Australians with full or partial Chinese ancestry there has been a general decline of institutional religions (between 2006 and 2016, Buddhism fell from 24.1% to 15.7% and Christianity fell from 29.8% to 23.4%). In 2016, 55.4% of the Chinese Australians fit within the census category of "not religious, secular beliefs or other spiritual beliefs", rising significantly from 37.8% in 2006. These shiftings in religious demography may be due to the incoming of new immigrants from China who generally do not have a formal religious affiliation, and many of whom are involved in the native Chinese religion (including Chinese ancestral worship) which has been experiencing a revival in China over the last decades.

There are also several notable Chinese temples that exist and still active in Australia, like Sarm Sung Goon Temple, Albion (built in 1886), Sze Yup Temple (built in 1898), Yiu Ming Temple (built in 1908) and Heavenly Queen Temple (Melbourne). Nan Tien Temple in New South Wales and Chung Tian Temple in Queensland are the oversea branch temples of Fo Guang Shan.

Politics
The federal electorate with the highest number of Chinese Australians is the Division of Bennelong in Sydney, which has been held by the Labor Party since 2022.

Socioeconomics

Education
In 2006, 55.0 percent for Chinese-born Australians aged 15 years and over had some form of higher non-school qualifications compared to 52.5 percent of the Australian population. Among Chinese-born Australians, 42.2 percent had Diploma level or higher* qualifications and 4.8 percent had Certificate level qualifications. For Chinese-born Australians, 88,440 had no higher non-school qualification, of which 35.3 percent were still attending an educational institution. In 2006, 57.3 per cent of the Hong Kong-born Australians aged 15 years and over had some form of higher non-school qualifications compared to 52.5 percent of the Australian population. Among the Hong Kong-born Australians, 45.7 per cent had Diploma level or higher qualifications and 6.1 percent had Certificate level qualifications. From the Hong Kong-born Australians, 28,720 had no higher non-school qualification, of which 44.7 per cent were still attending an educational institution.

In 2006, 31.9% of Chinese Australians attained a bachelor's degree compared to just 14.8% for the general Australian population. 36.1% of Hong Kong Australians attained a bachelor's degree or higher. Chinese Australians born overseas reported high educational attainment with over 50% of them holding at least bachelor's degree. When all these rates are melded, approximately 42 percent of (first and second generation) Chinese Australians have achieved a bachelor's degree, making it roughly three times the national average of 14 percent.

The pathways Chinese-Australian families choose to motivate their children is partly based on their cultural values which emphasise scholastic excellence, and partly on their own experiences in their native as well as in the host country. Customarily, activities taking place in Chinese-Australian homes were related to the education of their children. Regular family discussions on educational matters and career paths had a modelling effect. The key feature of these families was that parental involvement in their children's school-related activities remained high throughout the high school time of their children. Chinese-Australian families indicated that diligence, a deep cultural respect for education and motivation to become educated was quite strong among first generation immigrants. Chinese-Australians have a significant influence and place considerable pressure on their children academically. In addition, mathematics achievement and participation of high school students have a strong correlation towards the success or achievement goals and sense of competence. In addition, Chinese students from migrant backgrounds, in comparison to those from refugee backgrounds, are more academically successful.

Employment
Among Hong Kong-born Australians aged 15 years and over, the participation rate in the labour force was 63.3 percent and the unemployment rate was 6.6 percent. The corresponding rates in the total Australian population were 64.6 and 5.2 percent respectively. Of the 39,870 Hong Kong-born Australians who were employed, 42.2 percent were employed in a Skill Level 1 occupation, 12.3 percent in Skill Level 2 and 8.5 percent in Skill Level 3. The corresponding rates in the total Australian population were 28.7, 10.7 and 15.1 percent respectively.

Many Chinese Australians work in white collar middle class jobs. But Chinese Australians are under-represented in occupations such
as journalism, law and other professions that require language skills and face to face contact. First-generation Chinese Australians
also experience problems in getting white collar jobs commensurate with their qualifications and work experience. Instead, they go
into business and operate convenience stores, car dealerships, grocery stores, coffee shops, news agencies and restaurants while
making sacrifices to pay for their children's education. Perceiving education as the only available channel of social mobility, substantial
investment in children's education at a disproportionate sacrifice to family finance and social well-being is an indication of
parental concerns and expectations.

33.8% of Chinese Australians and 46.6% Hong Kong Australians work as white collar professionals compared to 32% for the total Australian population. 63.3% of Hong Kong Australians and 56.3% of Chinese Australians participate in the Australian workforce which was below the national average of 67.1%. Chinese Australians and Hong Kong Australians also have an unemployment rate of 11.2% and 6.6% respectively. Both figures were higher than the national average of 4.9%.

Economics
In 2006, the median individual weekly income for Chinese-born Australians aged 15 years and over was $242, compared with $431 for all overseas-born and $488 for all Australia-born. The total Australian population had a median individual weekly income of $466. In 2006, the median individual weekly income for Hong Kong-born Australians aged 15 years and over was $425, compared with $431 for all overseas-born and $488 for all Australia-born. The total Australian population had a median individual weekly income of $466. Therefore, median weekly earnings for Chinese Australians are relatively lower than the population average.

Notable Chinese Australians 

There have been numerous notable Chinese Australians in various fields throughout Australia's history.

Chinese place names in Australia 
Due to the long history of the Chinese in Australia, many places have Chinese names.

Conversely, many places also feature the archaic and now derogatory term "Chinaman" (see here).

See also

 History of Chinese Australians
 Chinatowns in Australia
 Chinatowns in Oceania
 Asian Australians
 White Australia policy
 Buckland riot (1857)
 Lambing Flat riots (1860–1861)
 China-Australia relations

References

Further reading
 Brawley, Sean, The White Peril – Foreign Relations and Asian Immigration to Australasia and North America 1919–1978, UNSW Press, Sydney, 1995. 9780868402789
 Cushman, J.W., "A 'Colonial Casualty': The Chinese community in Australian Historiography", Asian Studies Association of Australia, vol.7, no 3, April 1984.
 Fitzgerald, Shirley, Red Tape, Gold Scissors, State Library of NSW Press, Sydney, 1997.
 Macgregor, Paul (ed.), Histories of the Chinese in Australasia and the South Pacific, Museum of Chinese Australian History, Melbourne,1995.
 May, Cathie, Topsawyers: the Chinese in Cairns 1870 to 1920, James Cook University, Townsville, 1984.
 Williams, Michael, 2018, Returning home with glory: Chinese villagers around the Pacific, 1849 to 1949 (榮歸故里：太平洋地區的中國僑鄉 1849–1949), Hong Kong University Press, Hong Kong.
 Taylor, Antony. "Chinese Emigration to Australia around 1900: A Re-examination of Australia’s 'Great White Walls'" History Compass (Feb. 2013) 11#2 pp 104–116, DOI:10.1111/hic3.12032
 Williams, Michael, Chinese Settlement in NSW – A thematic history (Sydney: Heritage Office of NSW, 1999)

External links
 Chinese Museum Chinese Immigration to Australia 
 Chinese-Australian Historical Images in Australia
 Chinese Australian Historical Society
 From Quong Tarts to Victor Changs: Being Chinese in Australia in the Twentieth Century
 [http The Poison of Polygamy - the first Chinese Australian novel://chineseaustralianhistory.org Chinese Australian history website]
 Tracking The Dragon – A history of the Chinese in the Riverina  online exhibition
 Tracking the Dragon A guide for finding and assessing Chinese Australian heritage places
 The Harvest of Endurance scroll – an interactive representing two centuries of Chinese contact with, and emigration to, Australia at the National Museum of Australia
 Culture Victoria – Dreams of Jade and Gold – Chinese Australian families
  Chinese Language Records at Public Record Office Victoria
 The tiger’s mouth – Thoughts on the history and heritage of Chinese Australia
  (Chinese in Sydney) [CC-By-SA] 
 Chinese Australian History in 88 Objects